Stephanostegia is a genus of plant in the family Apocynaceae first described as a genus in 1888. The entire genus is endemic to Madagascar.

Species
 Stephanostegia capuronii Markgr. - E Madagascar
 Stephanostegia hildebrandtii Baill. - N +  W Madagascar

References

 
Endemic flora of Madagascar
Apocynaceae genera
Taxonomy articles created by Polbot
Taxa named by Henri Ernest Baillon